Gordon Howard "Gord, Bucky" Hollingworth (July 24, 1933 – February 2, 1974) was a Canadian ice hockey defenceman. Hollingworth played in the National Hockey League (NHL) for the Chicago Black Hawks and Detroit Red Wings between 1954 and 1958. The rest of his career, which lasted from 1953 to 1962, was spent in the minor leagues.

Playing career
Hollingworth was born in Montreal, Quebec. He played junior hockey with the Montreal Junior Canadiens and began his professional career with the Montreal Royals of the Quebec Hockey League in 1953-54. 

A defensive defenseman, he started his National Hockey League  career with the Chicago Black Hawks in 1954. That season he recorded 12 points while playing in all 70 games for the Black Hawks. He was involved in a blockbuster trade on May 28, 1955, moving to the Detroit Red Wings with Dave Creighton, John McCormack and Jerry Toppazzini in exchange for Tony Leswick, Glen Skov, Johnny Wilson and Benny Woit.

Hollingworth played parts of three seasons with the Red Wings and left the NHL after the 1958 season. He finished his career in the American Hockey League with the Cleveland Barons and the Hershey Bears. 

He retired from hockey completely in 1962 after being diagnosed with leukemia.

Career statistics

Regular season and playoffs

External links 
 

1933 births
1974 deaths
Anglophone Quebec people
Canadian ice hockey defencemen
Chicago Blackhawks players
Cleveland Barons (1937–1973) players
Detroit Red Wings players
Hershey Bears players
Ice hockey people from Montreal
Montreal Junior Canadiens players
Montreal Royals (QSHL) players
Springfield Indians players